Tyrone Breuninger (died May 6, 2012) was an American trombonist with the Philadelphia Orchestra as well as a euphonium/trombone/tuba teacher from Rowan University, located in Glassboro, New Jersey. Throughout his career, he also did freelance solo performances. His degrees include a Bachelor of Science in music education and an MM of music in performance. He also arranged a version of Georg Philipp Telemann's Sonata in G minor for euphonium.

Ensembles and events 
The Philadelphia Orchestra (1967–1999)
Associate principal trombone
Solo euphonium
The Atlantic Brass Band (at Rowan University)
Associate conductor
Luzerne Music Festival (Lake Luzerne, New York)
Coordinator of brass activities
EU-TU Quartet (euphonium and tuba)
The Festive Brass Quintet

Albums 
Breuninger recorded one album, The Classic Euphonium, containing within it:
 "Wee Cooper of Fife" - Traditional
 "Andante" (from Concerto for Double Bass) - Antonio Capuzzi
 "Rondo" (from Concerto for Double Bass) - Antonio Capuzzi
 "Aubade" - Philip Sparke
 "Moderato" (from Euphonium Concerto) - Joseph Horovitz
 "Lento" (from Euphonium Concerto) - Joseph Horovitz
 "Scherzando" (from Euphonium Concerto) - Joseph Horovitz
 "Romance" - Victor Ewald
 "Rhapsody for Euphonium" - James Curnow
 "My Heart at Thy Sweet Voice" - Camille Saint-Saëns
 "Fantasy" - Philip Sparke

Sources 

https://web.archive.org/web/20050326032805/http://www.rowan.edu/fpa/music/our_assets/bio/breuninger.html
http://www.goodnewsmusic.com/audiocds/8913581.html
http://dwerden.com/emg/recordingsearch.cfm?Song=&Composer=&AlbTitle=&Artist=Breuninger%2C+Tyrone&doSearch=1

American music educators
Rowan University faculty
Year of birth missing
2012 deaths
Musicians of the Philadelphia Orchestra